Kateřina Rudčenková (12 April 1976, Prague) is a Czech poet and playwright.

Work
She published Ludwig, her first book of poetry in 1999 and her second collection in 2001. These established her as an important contemporary poet, culminating in her winning the prestigious Magnesia Litera Award in 2014 for her collection Chůze po dunách (Walking on Dunes, 2013). Her selected poems have appeared in an English translation by Alexandra Büchler, which was nominated for the Oxford-Weidenfeld Prize.

Other works include a short story collection called Noci, Noci (Nights, Nights, 2004), and several plays that have been translated and staged around the world.

References

Czech poets
1976 births
Living people
Writers from Prague